Johnny Eulogio Palacios Suazo (born 20 December 1986) is a Honduran footballer who plays as a defender for Olimpia.

Personal life
His brothers are Milton, Jerry, Wilson and Edwin René Palacios. On 30 October 2007 Edwin, aged 14, was kidnapped in La Ceiba; he was found dead one year and seven months later in Omoa.

Club career
A one-club man, he has only played professional football for Olimpia so far.

International career
Palacios made his debut for Honduras in a July 2009 CONCACAF Gold Cup match against Grenada and has, as of February 2013, earned a total of 15 caps, scoring no goals. He has represented his country in 1 FIFA World Cup qualification match and played at the 2011 UNCAF Nations Cup as well as at the 2009 CONCACAF Gold Cup.

In the 2010 FIFA World Cup, held in South Africa, Honduras achieved an historical distinction by including brothers Jerry, Johnny, and Wilson in their squad. They became the first trio of brothers to represent a single nation in the World Cup. Johnny however did not play in any match.

Honours
Liga Nacional de Fútbol de Honduras: 10
Clausura 2008, Clausura 2009, Clausura 2010, Apertura 2011, Clausura 2012, Apertura 2012, Clausura 2013, Clausura 2014, Clausura 2015, Clausura 2016

Copa Centroamericana: 1
2011

References

External links

1986 births
Living people
People from La Ceiba
Association football defenders
Garifuna people
Honduran footballers
Honduras international footballers
2009 CONCACAF Gold Cup players
2010 FIFA World Cup players
2011 Copa Centroamericana players
2013 CONCACAF Gold Cup players
2015 CONCACAF Gold Cup players
C.D. Olimpia players
Liga Nacional de Fútbol Profesional de Honduras players
Copa Centroamericana-winning players
Footballers at the 2016 Summer Olympics
Olympic footballers of Honduras